Cheneya is a small genus of moths of the Bombycidae family, within which it is placed in subfamily Epiinae.

Species
 Cheneya irrufata Dognin, 1911
 Cheneya morissa Schaus, 1929
 Cheneya rovena Schaus, 1929

References

 

Bombycidae
Moth genera